Dalek Emperor may refer to one of several characters in the long-running British science fiction television series Doctor Who:
Emperor Dalek, from The Evil of the Daleks
Dalek Emperor, from Remembrance of the Daleks, really Davros
Dalek Emperor, from The Parting of the Ways
Dalek Emperor, from City of the Daleks